The 1860 United States presidential election in Minnesota took place on November 6, 1860, as part of the 1860 United States presidential election. Minnesota voters chose four representatives, or electors, to the Electoral College, who voted for president and vice president.

Minnesota voted in its first ever United States presidential election, having been admitted as the 32nd state on May 11, 1858. The state was won by Illinois Representative Abraham Lincoln (Republican Party (United States)), running with Senator Hannibal Hamlin, with 63.44% of the popular vote, against Senator Stephen A. Douglas (D–Illinois), running with 41st Governor of Georgia Herschel V. Johnson, with 34.27% of the popular vote.

With 63.44% of the popular vote, Lincoln's victory within the state would be his second strongest victory in terms of percentage in the popular vote in the 1860 election after Vermont. Minnesota would never vote Democratic until Franklin D. Roosevelt won it in 1932, 72 years later.

Results

Results by county

See also 
 United States presidential elections in Minnesota

Notes

References 

Minnesota
1860
1860 Minnesota elections